Minnesota State Highway 3 (MN 3) is a  state highway in Minnesota, which runs from its intersection with MN 21 in Faribault and continues north to its northern terminus at an intersection with MN 5 in downtown Saint Paul. Until the resigning of a previously unsigned highway in 2019, the route's northern terminus was an interchange with MN 62 in Inver Grove Heights.

Route description
MN 3 serves as a north-south route between Saint Paul, West Saint Paul, Inver Grove Heights, Eagan, Rosemount, Farmington, Northfield, and Faribault.  The highway is primarily a two-lane highway with paved shoulders in rural areas, with some multiple-lane sections in urban areas.

Beginning at its southern terminus in Faribault at MN 21, MN 3 heads due east along
20th Street NW for about 1 mile, before turning north along 2nd Avenue NW.  MN 3 then roughly follows the Cannon River toward Northfield, with gentle curves through alternating wooded areas and open farmland.  After passing through the Northfield area, MN 3 travels a primarily straight route through open fields heading toward Farmington. Between Farmington and Rosemount, MN 3 is flat and mostly straight. This portion of the route passes by housing developments, farm fields, and a gravel and sand mining operation.  Two roundabouts (at 190th Street W and 170th Street W) are also encountered here. Beyond Rosemount, MN 3 passes through the cities of Eagan and Inver Grove Heights. Here, the highway becomes more curvy and built-up than previous sections. MN 3 parallels a rail line through Eagan, and travelling through Inver Grove Heights, the road passes through a heavily wooded area with many sharp turns. MN 3 then travels through a valley and continues to a junction with MN 55. It continues northbound, passing through rolling, wooded hills over a mostly straight path to its junctions at I-494 and MN 62. In 2018-19, the Minnesota Department of Transportation quietly changed the designation of unsigned MN 952A to MN 3, effectively extending the route north through West Saint Paul along Robert Street into downtown Saint Paul.

Legally, MN 3 is defined as legislative routes 1, 115, and 334 in the Minnesota Statutes.  The route is not marked with those numbers.

The maximum speed limit posted on MN 3 is 60 mph.  The open stretches of MN 3 from Faribault to 170th Street W near Rosemount generally have a 60 mph limit, with lower limits in the Northfield and Farmington areas.  All other sections are posted at 55 mph or lower, particularly through cities and curvier portions of the highway.  Speed studies were conducted on the highway in 2015 on the Northfield to Eagan section, and in 2018 on the Faribault to Northfield section.  The studies authorized a new maximum allowed speed limit of 60 mph from Faribault to the south end of Rosemount.

History
MN 3 was established in 1963, from the southern portion of former MN 218. This route was originally numbered 65 as part of old U.S. Highway 65 (US 65) from 1927 to 1934. It was built between Faribault and MN 149 in Inver Grove Heights and was paved as early as 1929.

The route was renumbered 218 in 1934 as part of old US 218 from 1934 to 1935, which was eventually redesignated MN 218 from 1935 to 1963.  The route was renumbered MN 3 in 1963.

The route was once part of the Jefferson Highway, an automobile highway stretching through the central U.S. until the late 1920s.  MN 3 is still part of unmarked Constitutional Route 1.

From the late 1970s to 1994, MN 3 was previously routed on the Lafayette Freeway through South St. Paul / West St. Paul to downtown Saint Paul.  Nearby US 52 was routed on a stretch of Robert Street during this period of time.  The Lafayette Freeway was completely constructed in 1994, US 52 was then rerouted along that route and MN 3 was shortened to a northern terminus at its junction with MN 62 in Inver Grove Heights.  Recently MnDOT has indicated it considers the stretch of Robert Street from downtown St. Paul through West St. Paul to be Highway 3, and has recently signed the road in West St. Paul with Minnesota Highway 3 shields and reflects the roadway as MN-3 on their project web pages.

Major intersections

References

External links

Highway 3 at Minnesota Highway Endings

003
Transportation in Rice County, Minnesota
Transportation in Dakota County, Minnesota
Transportation in Ramsey County, Minnesota
Streets in Saint Paul, Minnesota
U.S. Route 65